Oskar Munzinger (18 March 1849 – 18 May 1932) was a Swiss politician and President of the Swiss Council of States (1893/1894).

External links 
 
 

1849 births
1932 deaths
Members of the Council of States (Switzerland)
Presidents of the Council of States (Switzerland)